Ludovik Jakova (14 February 1912 – 26 June 1978) was an Albanian footballer and coach of Albania national football team for a short spell in 1949–1950, where he led the team in six friendlies.

He holds the questionable record of leading the national team in its heaviest defeat of all time, a 12-0 reverse against Hungary in 1950.

Honours
Albanian Superliga: 3
 1934, 1936, 1937

References

1912 births
1988 deaths
Association footballers not categorized by position
Albanian footballers
KF Tirana players
Kategoria Superiore players
Albanian football managers
Albania national football team managers